Raging Fists is a 1975 French drama film directed by Éric Le Hung.

Cast
 Philippe Lavot : Antoine "Toni"
 Françoise Dorner : "BB la brune"
 Tony Gatlif : Nanar
 Marie-Georges Pascal : Christine
 Gilles Chevallier : Johnny
 Frédéric Norbert : Michou
 Patrick Jeantet : Dédé
 Sylvain Rougerie : Bouboule
 Fred Ulysse : Mr. Sevin
 Pascale Roberts : Mrs. Sevin
 Étienne Bierry : Tony's father
 Pierre Tornade : Jo, the bartender
 Roger Dumas : a Neighbour
 André Thorent : The Commissar
 Su Ssy : The Baka

References

External links
 
 La Rage au poing at Encyclo-ciné (French)

1975 films
1970s French-language films
1975 drama films
French drama films
1970s French films